139P/Väisälä–Oterma is a periodic comet in the Solar System. When it was discovered in 1939 it was not recognized as a comet and designated as asteroid 1939 TN.

References

External links 
 Orbital simulation from JPL (Java) / Horizons Ephemeris
 139P/Vaisala-Oterma – Seiichi Yoshida @ aerith.net
139P at Kronk's Cometography

Periodic comets
0139
Discoveries by Liisi Oterma
+
Comets in 2017
19391007